The Women's +87 kg weightlifting competitions at the 2020 Summer Olympics in Tokyo took place on 2 August 2021 at the Tokyo International Forum. During the competition, Laurel Hubbard made history by becoming the first transgender woman athlete to compete in the Olympics.

Records

Results

References

Weightlifting at the 2020 Summer Olympics
Olymp
Women's events at the 2020 Summer Olympics